S 30 is a  sailboat class designed by Knud Reimers and built in about 300 copies.

History
The S 30 was designed by Knud Reimers for Göta Segelsällskap and Swedish Sailing Federation and produced by Fisksätra varv.

References

1970s sailboat type designs
Sailboat type designs by Swedish designers
Keelboats
Sailboat types built in Sweden